Priya Wal is an Indian television actress. Wal played various roles such as Anvesha in Remix on Star One and Aditi in Kahaani Ghar Ghar Kii on StarPlus. She is best known for portraying Misha Dobriyal in Star One's hit television series  Pyaar Kii Ye Ek Kahaani.

Career

Wal started her television career as Anvesha Banerjee (Priya Wal) in the youth-based show Remix on Star One. The character of red haired tom boy, Anvesha Banerjee fondly called 'Ashi' gave her instant fame.

After that she was a part of several TV shows such as Jeete Hain Jiske Liye as Ayesha, C.I.D. as Dr. Nyla Rajyadhakshya on Sony Entertainment Television (India), Sun Yaar Chill Maar on Bindass, "Yes Boss" as Imrati Devi and in Kahaani Ghar Ghar Kii as Aditi Aggrawal.

In 2010 and 2011, she played the role of Misha in the youth based supernatural show, Pyaar Kii Ye Ek Kahaani on Star One. She was seen as Riya Oberoi Tum Dena Saath Mera. She took a break owing to health concerns after Pyaar Kii Ye Ek Kahaani and made a comeback in 2013 with Channel [V]’s V The Serial. In the same year, she became a part of MTV Webbed, a show based on spreading awareness against cyber abuse in association with the NGO, Cyber Crime Awareness Society (CCAS).

In 2015, she appeared in a music video "O Meri Jaan" directed by Waseem Sabir to support the cause of giving a good upbringing to the girl child along with other TV celebrities. In the same year, she made a comeback to television with her role Barkha in &TV's Gangaa, but later quit the show due to health issues. Priya Wal has directed a documentary movie. She has also made a short film "Koi Kuch Karta Kyun Nahin" with Sukirti Kandpal and others. In 2016, she wrote the script of a Bangladeshi show Super Girls, a show based on glamour world and aired on GTV (Bangladesh).

She is seen in her own short web series Misadventures of a television actor on her own YouTube channel.

Television

Web series

Filmography

Music video(s)

Theatre

Awards

References

External links

 

Indian television actresses
Actresses from Rajasthan
Living people
People from Ajmer
Year of birth missing (living people)